The Mysterious Rose is a 1914 American mystery silent black and white film directed by Francis Ford and written by Grace Cunard.

Cast
 Grace Cunard as Lady Raffles
 Francis Ford as Detective Phil Kelly
 Jack Ford as Dopey
 Harry Schumm as District Attorney's Son
 Wilbur Higby as Ward Boss
 Eddie Boland as Yeen Kee

References

External links
 
 

American mystery films
1910s mystery films
American silent short films
American black-and-white films
Films directed by Francis Ford
Films with screenplays by Grace Cunard
Universal Pictures short films
1910s American films
Silent mystery films